Matthew James Waite (born 24 December 1995) is an English cricketer who plays for Yorkshire County Cricket Club. Primarily a right-handed batsman, he also bowls right-arm fast-medium. In March 2019, in the match against Leeds/Bradford MCCU in the 2019 Marylebone Cricket Club University Matches, Waite took his maiden five-wicket haul in first-class cricket.

References

External links
 
 

1995 births
Living people
English cricketers
Cricketers from Leeds
Yorkshire cricketers
Worcestershire cricketers